Zaviyeh (also Romanized as Zāvīyeh and Zāvyeh; also known as Shahr-e Zāvīyeh and Zārīyeh) is a city in the Central District of Zarandieh County, Markazi Province, Iran.  At the 2006 census, its population was 6,141, in 1,624 families.

References

Cities in Markazi Province
Populated places in Zarandieh County